The Angolan men's national basketball team is controlled by the Federação Angolana de Basquetebol. Angola has been a member of FIBA since 1979. Ranking 23rd in the FIBA World Rankings, Angola is the top team of FIBA Africa, and a regular competitor at the Summer Olympic Games and the FIBA World Cup.

History
Angola made its first official match against Nigeria, under coach Victorino Cunha on 1 February 1976, having lost 62–71.

International competitions
Angola has competed in many international competitions, including the 1992 Summer Olympics, 1996 Summer Olympics, 2000 Summer Olympics, 2002 World Championship, 2004 Summer Olympics, the 2006 World Championship, the 2010 World Championship, and the 2014 Basketball World Cup as well as the FIBA Africa Championship, where the team has won 11 of the last 16 championships, with the first coming in 1989, and the most recent in 2013. In addition, they won the tournament at the 1987 All-Africa Games, 2003 All-Africa Games and 2007 All-Africa Games.

2006 FIBA World Championship
Angola competed at the 2006 World Championship in Group B, alongside Germany, Japan, New Zealand, Panama, and Spain. In group play, they finished with 3 wins (versus Panama, New Zealand, and Japan), and 2 losses (versus Spain and Germany). They lost in the knockout stage to France, for a total record of 3 wins and 3 losses, good for 10th place overall, ahead of traditional basketball powerhouse Serbia and Montenegro.

2014 FIBA World Championship
Angola qualified for the event through winning the AfroBasket 2013, its 11th title in 13 consecutive African Championship Tournaments. At the 2014 FIBA World Cup, Angola was especially noteworthy for its rebounds and steals. In both categories, the African Champion was among the top-5 at the World Cup.

Tournament record

Olympic Games

FIBA World Cup

FIBA Africa Championship

African Games

Team

Current roster
Roster for the AfroBasket 2021.

Depth chart

Notable players
 Jean-Jacques Conceição
 José Carlos Guimarães
 Miguel Lutonda
 Carlos Almeida

Head coach position

Past rosters

All-time record against all nations

See also
 Angola national basketball team Under-18
 Angola national basketball team Under-16
 List of Angola national basketball team players

Notes

References

External links

FIBA profile
Angolan National Team – Afrobasket.com

 
Men's national basketball teams